Susan Grace Duku is a South Sudanese  refugee advocate, and activist. She founded Refugee Women and Youth Aid (RWYA). She is a 2021 Amujae Leader.

She was a leader at Rhino Settlement, Uganda.

She was a plenary speaker at the 2019 Global Refugee Forum.  In 2019, she was a  panelist at the Tokyo International Conference on African Development (TICAD).

She lives in Sweden.

Works

References

External links 
 usan Grace Duku shares what she is most looking forward to as a 2021 Amujae Leader, EJS Center, Feb 12, 2021
Plenary Session - Global Refugee Forum, UN Live United Nations Web TV,  17 Dec 2019

Year of birth missing (living people)
Living people
Refugees
South Sudanese activists